Bełchówka  (Belkhivka) is a former village in the administrative district of Gmina Bukowsko, within Sanok County, Subcarpathian Voivodeship, in south-eastern Poland.

References

Villages in Sanok County